Agnes Yulo Diego (born February 16, 1993), known online as Akidearest, is a Filipino-American YouTuber. She is best known for discussing anime, manga, otaku culture and Japanese-related content on her YouTube channel.

Early life 
Diego was born in Bakersfield, California, on February 16, 1993, to parents of Filipino ethnicity, and was raised in Virginia before then eventually moving to Las Vegas, Nevada. Growing-up, Diego got into creating Anime music videos (AMV) and had a prior YouTube channel that hosted some of her work. After completing a degree in psychology at university, Diego decided to pursue YouTube as a career.

Career 
Diego created her second and current YouTube channel "Akidearest" on December 18, 2014, with a focus on discussing anime, manga, and otaku culture; her first video, "REACTION: DMMD Love Scene," in which Diego reacts to a scene in Dramatical Murder, was released on December 26, 2014. Considered as her break-out video, "5 Songs That Will Change The Way You See Vocaloid," was released on January 12, 2016; the video delves into serious topics that fans to causal listeners of Vocaloid might not expect. On August 21, 2017, Akidearest hit one million subscribers. From 2017 to 2018, Diego co-hosted a weekly SBS podcast titled, The Anime Show, with Joseph Bizinger (The Anime Man), which ran for 68 episodes that discussed about anime, manga, and otaku culture.

In January 2019, Diego moved to Japan, at which time her channel expanded to include her experiences while living in Japan. In same year, Diego also made an in-game cameo appearance in The World Next Door, by Rose City Games.

Personal life 
On November 4, 2016, both she and fellow YouTuber Joey Bizinger announced that they were in a relationship.

References

External links 
 

1993 births
Living people
American expatriates in Japan
American people of Filipino descent
People from Bakersfield, California
People from Las Vegas
YouTube vloggers
YouTube channels launched in 2014
YouTubers from California